M'Bairo Abakar (born January 13, 1961) is a judoka who competed internationally for Chad.

Abakar represented Chad at the 1992 Summer Olympics in Barcelona in the half-middleweight (-78 kg) category, he received a bye in the first round, but they lost to Jason Morris in the second round, therefore he did not advance any further.

References

1961 births
Chadian male judoka
Olympic judoka of Chad
Judoka at the 1992 Summer Olympics
Living people